William L. Penterman (born May 18, 1996) is an American dairy farmer and Republican politician.  He is a member of the Wisconsin State Assembly, representing the 37th Assembly district since July 26, 2021.

Biography
Penterman was born and raised in Wisconsin, working on his family's dairy farm.  He attended Ripon College, and while there founded Ripon College's chapter of Young Americans for Freedom—a Conservative youth organization.

Penterman served in the United States Army from 2015 through 2019, in the Military Police Corps, and continues to serve in the United States Army Reserve.

He worked as a legislative assistant in the Wisconsin State Assembly, and was clerk to the Assembly Committee on Campaigns and Elections during the post-election challenges to the results of the 2020 United States presidential election.

In 2021, the 37th State Assembly district became vacant when incumbent John Jagler won a special election to the Wisconsin State Senate.  Penterman declared his candidacy and narrowly won a crowded eight-candidate Republican primary.  He went on to win the special election with 54% over Democrat Pete Adams.

Electoral history

Wisconsin Assembly (2021)

| colspan="6" style="text-align:center;background-color: #e9e9e9;"| Special Republican Primary, June 15, 2021

| colspan="6" style="text-align:center;background-color: #e9e9e9;"| Special Election, July 13, 2021

References

External links
 
 Campaign website
 37th Assembly District map (2011–2021)

Year of birth uncertain
Living people
People from Columbus, Wisconsin
21st-century American politicians
Republican Party members of the Wisconsin State Assembly
American military police officers
United States Army reservists
1996 births